AFI Europe is a real estate development and investment company operating in several main cities in Central and Eastern Europe.
AFI Europe predominantly focuses on the development of large scale residential and commercial  projects, and is part of the AFI Group, an international holdings and investments conglomerate.

Projects And Properties 
The assets portfolio of AFI Europe consists of shopping malls and retail properties, business parks and office complexes, large-scale residential and mixed-use projects and income-yielding residential properties. 
Among the company's outstanding assets are AFI Palace Cotroceni, the largest shopping mall in Bucharest; Airport City, a leading business park in Belgrade; Classic 7, a famous office project in Prague; and :pl:Osiedle Europejskie, a large-scale residential project in Krakow
AFI Europe also has a large inventory of land for future development.

History 
The company commenced its operations in 1997 and coordinates AFI Group activities in Europe, and is headquartered in the Netherlands since 2006.

Controversy 
During the money laundering case United States vs Prevezon Holdings which involved Sergei Magnitsky companies stolen by Denis Katsyv, Prevezon Holdings accounts with AFI Europe were frozen but, after the out of court settlement was reached between Joon Kim, the acting US Attorney for the Southern District of New York, and both Louis Freeh and Natalia Veselnitskaya, who were attorneys for Prevezon, Prevezon stated that money to pay its $5.9 million fine would come from the Netherlands from more than $3 million that AFI Europe owed to Prevezon.

Countries of operation 
AFI Europe owns, develops and manages properties and projects in Serbia, Czech Republic Germany, Hungary, Bulgaria, Poland, Latvia, and Romania. with on-the-ground teams comprising more than 150 professionals.

References

Real estate companies
Investment companies